Stokkan is a surname. Notable people with the surname include:

Arild Stokkan-Grande (born 1978), Norwegian politician
Ketil Stokkan (born 1956), Norwegian pop artist 

Norwegian-language surnames